The 2002–03 Scottish Second Division was won by Raith Rovers who, along with second placed Brechin City, were promoted to the First Division. Stranraer and Cowdenbeath were relegated to the Third Division.

Table

Attendance

The average attendance for Scottish Second Division clubs for season 2002/03 are shown below:

References

Scottish Second Division seasons
2
3
Scot